This list of tallest buildings in Canberra ranks the tallest in Australia's capital city by height. This ranking system, created by the US-based Council on Tall Buildings and Urban Habitat includes the height to a spire but not to an antenna. The High Society Towers at 113m and 100m respectively, with 27 storeys, are the tallest in the city. It is in Belconnen, a district of North Canberra.

As a result, the highest buildings are now found in the outer town centres, such as Phillip and Belconnen.

Tallest buildings

These are the high-rise buildings of Canberra.

Tallest buildings proposed or under construction

See also

List of tallest buildings in Australia
List of tallest buildings in Oceania

References

External links
 Emporis.com Canberra High-rise Buildings

 01
Canberra
tallest
Tallest buildings
Landmarks in Canberra